Claud Charles Castleton, VC (12 April 1893 – 29 July 1916) was an Australian recipient of the Victoria Cross, the highest award for gallantry in the face of the enemy that can be awarded to British and Commonwealth forces.

Early life
Claud Castleton was born in Kirkley, Lowestoft, England. Educated at a council school, he won a scholarship to the grammar school. In 1912 he set off on a long adventure, stopping first at Melbourne, Australia. He worked in various parts of Australia before heading to New Guinea, intending to earn funds for the return journey to England via New Zealand, India and Africa. Matters changed with the outbreak of the First World War; he joined the Australian force formed in New Guinea for the defence of the area in the face of German warship activities.

First World War
In March 1915 Castleton returned to Sydney and enlisted in the Australian Imperial Force. He subsequently served at Gallipoli, where he earned promotion. He later transferred to the Australian Machine Gun Corps. He was 23 years old, and a sergeant in the 5th Machine Gun Company, 5th Brigade, 2nd Division when the following deed took place for which he was awarded the VC.

Castleton is buried at Pozières British Military Cemetery, Somme, France, 3 miles NE of Albert (Plot IV, Row L, Grave 43). The inscription on his gravestone reads: A NOBLE LIFE LAID DOWN FOR FREEDOM WE SHALL MEET OUR LOVED ONE AGAIN.

Legacy
Castleton's Victoria Cross is displayed at the Australian War Memorial in Canberra. Castleton Crescent in the Canberra suburb of Gowrie was named in his honour. There is a brass plaque to him at the former South Cliff Congregational Church, now St Nicholas's Catholic Church, in south Lowestoft.

Notes

References

Further reading
In Search of Claud, Steve Snelling, Eastern Daily Press, Saturday, 1 July 2006. Sunday supplement p10–11.

External links
J. K. Haken, 'Castleton, Claud Charles (1893–1916)', Australian Dictionary of Biography, Volume 7, Melbourne University Press, 1979, p. 589.
 Claude Charles CASTLETON, The AIF Project, www.aif.adfa.edu.au
 Victoria Cross : Sergeant Claud Charles Castleton, AWM Collection Record: REL/18262
 Sergeant Claud Charles Castleton, www.anzacday.org.au
 

1893 births
1916 deaths
Military personnel from Suffolk
Australian Battle of the Somme recipients of the Victoria Cross
Australian Army soldiers
People from Lowestoft
Australian military personnel killed in World War I